The 2013 Kansas Jayhawks football team represented the University of Kansas in the 2013 NCAA Division I FBS football season. The Jayhawks were led by second year head coach Charlie Weis and played their home games at Memorial Stadium. They were a member of the Big 12 Conference.

On September 21, with a 13–10 win over Louisiana Tech, the Jayhawks ended a 22-game losing streak to FBS opponents. On November 16, the Jayhawks ended their 27 conference game losing streak with a 31–19 defeat of visiting West Virginia. The conference win was the Jayhawks first conference win since their 52–45 defeat of Colorado during the 2010 season.

Coaching staff

Schedule

Roster

Awards
Trevor Pardula
 Week 4 Ray Guy Award Player of the Week
 Week 4 Big 12 Special Teams Player of the Week
 Week 4 College Football Performance Awards Punter of the Week

Isiah Johnson
 Big 12 Newcomer of the Year

All Conference
2nd team
 James sims – RB
 Ben heeny – LB
Honorable Mention
 Ngalu fusimalohi – OL
 Isaiah johnson – DB 
 Dexter mcdonald – DB
 Jimmay mundine – TE
 Trevor pardula – P
 JaCorey shepherd – KR/PR/DB
 James sims – RB

References

Kansas
Kansas Jayhawks football seasons
Kansas Jayhawks football